The following article presents a summary of the 2014 football (soccer) season in Brazil, which was the 113th season of competitive football in the country.

Campeonato Brasileiro Série A

The 2014 Campeonato Brasileiro Série A started on April 19, 2014, and concluded on December 7, 2014.

Atlético Mineiro
Atlético Paranaense
Bahia
Botafogo
Chapecoense
Corinthians
Coritiba
Criciúma
Cruzeiro
Figueirense
Flamengo
Fluminense
Goiás
Grêmio
Internacional
Palmeiras
Santos
São Paulo
Sport
Vitória

Cruzeiro won the Campeonato Brasileiro Série A.

Relegation
The four worst placed teams, which are Vitória, Bahia, Botafogo and Criciúma, were relegated to the following year's second level.

Campeonato Brasileiro Série B

The 2014 Campeonato Brasileiro Série B started on April 19, 2014 and concluded on November 29, 2014.

ABC
América (MG)
América (RN)
Atlético Goianiense
Avaí
Boa Esporte
Bragantino
Ceará
Icasa
Joinville
Luverdense
Náutico
Oeste
Paraná
Ponte Preta
Portuguesa
Sampaio Corrêa
Santa Cruz
Vasco da Gama
Vila Nova

Joinville won the Campeonato Brasileiro Série B.

Promotion
The four best placed teams, which are Joinville, Ponte Preta, Vasco da Gama and Avaí, were promoted to the following year's first level.

Relegation
The four worst placed teams, which are América (RN), Icasa, Vila Nova and Portuguesa, were relegated to the following year's third level.

Campeonato Brasileiro Série C

The 2014 Campeonato Brasileiro Série C started on April 26, 2014, and concluded on November 23, 2014.

Águia de Marabá
ASA de Arapiraca
Botafogo-PB
Caxias
CRAC
CRB
Cuiabá
Duque de Caxias
Fortaleza
Guarani
Guaratinguetá
Juventude
Macaé
Madureira
Mogi Mirim
Paysandu
Salgueiro
São Caetano
Treze
Tupi

The Campeonato Brasileiro Série C final was played between Oeste and Icasa.

Macaé won the league after beating Paysandu on goal difference.

Promotion
The four best placed teams, which are Macaé, Paysandu, Mogi Mirim and CRB, were promoted to the following year's second level.

Relegation
The four worst placed teams, which are São Caetano, Treze, CRAC and Duque de Caxias, were relegated to the following year's fourth level.

Campeonato Brasileiro Série D

The 2014 Campeonato Brasileiro Série D started on July 19, 2014 and concluded on November 16, 2014.

Anapolina
Ariquemes
Atlético Acreano
Baraúnas
Boavista
Brasil de Pelotas
Brasiliense
Cabofriense
Campinense
CENE
Central
Confiança
Coruripe
Estrela do Norte
Globo
Goianésia
Grêmio Barueri
Guarani de Palhoça
Guarany de Sobral
Interporto
Ipatinga
Ituano
Jacuipense
Londrina
Luziânia
Maringá
Metropolitano
Moto Club
Operário de Várzea Grande
Pelotas
Penapolense
Porto
Princesa do Solimões
Remo
Rio Branco
Ríver
São Raimundo-RR
Santos-AP
Tombense
Villa Nova
Vitória da Conquista

The Campeonato Brasileiro Série D final was played between Brasil de Pelotas and Tombense.

Tombense won the league after beating Brasil de Pelotas 4-2 on penalties.

Promotion
The four best placed teams, which are Tombense, Brasil de Pelotas, Confiança and Londrina, were promoted to the following year's third level.

Copa do Brasil

The 2014 Copa do Brasil started on February 19, 2014, and concluded on November 26, 2014. The Copa do Brasil final was played between Atlético Mineiro and Cruzeiro.

Atlético Mineiro won the cup by aggregate score of 3–0.

State championship champions

Youth competition champions

(1) The Copa Nacional do Espírito Santo Sub-17, between 2008 and 2012, was named Copa Brasil Sub-17. The similar named Copa do Brasil Sub-17 is organized by the Brazilian Football Confederation and it was first played in 2013.

Other competition champions

Brazilian clubs in international competitions

Brazil national team
The following table lists all the games played by the Brazilian national team in official competitions and friendly matches during 2014.

Record

Friendlies

FIFA World Cup

Superclásico de las Américas

Women's football

National team
The following table lists all the games played by the Brazil women's national football team in official competitions and friendly matches during 2014.

Friendlies

South American Games

Copa América Femenina

Torneio Internacional de Brasília

The Brazil women's national football team competed in the following competitions in 2014:

Campeonato Brasileiro de Futebol Feminino

The 2014 Campeonato Brasileiro de Futebol Feminino started on September 10, 2014, and concluded on November 30, 2014.

The Campeonato Brasileiro de Futebol Feminino final was played between Ferroviária and Kindermann.

Ferroviária won the league by aggregate score of 8–3.

Copa do Brasil de Futebol Feminino

The 2014 Copa do Brasil de Futebol Feminino started on January 29, 2014 and concluded on April 15, 2014.

Ferroviária won the cup after beating São José 5-4 on penalties.

Domestic competition champions

Brazilian clubs in international competitions

References

 Brazilian competitions at RSSSF

 
Seasons in Brazilian football